Jindong-myeon is a myeon (township) under the administration of Masanhappo-gu, Changwon, South Gyeongsang Province, South Korea. , it administers the following ten villages:
Jindong-ri
Gohyeon-ri
Singi-ri
Sadong-ri
Yojang-ri
Dagu-ri
Gyodong-ri
Taebong-ri
Ingok-ri
Dongjeon-ri

References 

Towns and townships in South Gyeongsang Province
Changwon